For Maria Ebun Pataki is a 2020 drama film directed by Damilola Orimogunje. It features Meg Otanwa and Gabriel Afolayan in the leading roles. The film explores post-partum depression and was filmed in Yoruba language with English language subtitles. The film earned six nominations in the 2020 Africa Movie Academy Awards.

Plot 
Derin suffers a turbulent time while in labour and subsequently delivers her first child named Maria. Following this, she keeps to herself and is unable to participate in celebratory rites and the care of her newborn. Not understanding her plight, Derin's mother-in-law verbally abuses her saying she is not a good mother.

Cast 

 Gabriel Afolayan as Afolabi
 Meg Otanwa as Derin
 Tina Mba as Grandma
 Judith Audu as Tola
 Demi Banwo as AY
 Tubi Aiyedehin as Doctor

Production and release 
For Maria Ebun Pataki was the debut feature film of Damilola Orimogunje. Damilola Orimogunje said in an interview that he was inspired to make the film after waching a French film titled Amour and having a conversation about post-partum depression. It was shot for a period of 9 days in November 2019 in Ojodu, Lagos. Meg Otanwa revealed via an Instagram post that she intentionally gained weight for her role in the film in order to portray a realistic post-birth body. The film premiered in November 2020 at Film Africa where it won the Audience Award for Best Narrative Feature. It started streaming on Netflix on 16 January 2022.

Reception 
For Maria Ebun Pataki received largely positive reviews as it was described by the BBC as "intimate, artistic, unusual" and by the Guardian as “a quietly affecting Nigerian film.” A reviewer for the Daily Trust praised the writing saying "The performances are stellar in this film but the writing is a blinding light. The writers make the story connect with the audience by creating a world full of characters that are real and tangible".

Awards and nominations

References

External links 

2020 films
Films about depression
Postpartum depression in film
Nigerian drama films
Films shot in Lagos
Yoruba-language films
2020s pregnancy films